Parvesh Singh Cheena (born July 22, 1979) is an American actor. He is best known for his roles as Gupta in the TV series Outsourced and as Sunil Odhav on Crazy Ex-Girlfriend. He also voices Bodhi in T.O.T.S.

Early life
Cheena was born in Elk Grove, Illinois, of Indian descent. He grew up in Naperville, Illinois, a suburb of Chicago, and went to Waubonsie Valley High School. He studied musical theatre at the Chicago College of Performing Arts.

Personal life
Cheena is gay. In August 2021, he criticized representation of gay characters in media, telling Insider that "White people were allowed to be gay, in a sense, or be queer as an identifier. People see our color and ethnicity first before our sexuality."

He is also a member of the Democratic Socialists of America.

He currently resides in Los Angeles, California.

Filmography

Film

Television

References

External links
 Official site
 
 Interview with Parvesh Cheena

1979 births
Living people
American male voice actors
American male musical theatre actors
American male film actors
American male television actors
American gay actors
LGBT people from Illinois
American LGBT people of Asian descent
Roosevelt University alumni
American male actors of Indian descent
Male actors from Chicago
21st-century American male actors
Members of the Democratic Socialists of America